Bethanie (often in German: Bethanien, and in English: Bethany, previously Klipfontein, Khoekhoegowab: ǀUiǂgandes) is a village in the  ǁKaras Region of southern Namibia. It is one of the oldest settlements in the country. Bethanie is situated on the road C14 between Goageb and Walvis Bay, 100 km west of Keetmanshoop. It has a population of about 2,000.

History
The area around Bethanie originally belonged to the Red Nation. At the beginning of the 18th century  the ǃAman (Bethanie Orlam), a subtribe of the Orlam people, obtained settlement rights and settled here. As missionaries started travelling north from the Cape Colony in the early 19th century, they established mission stations on their way. The London Missionary Society founded the town, but, because of a shortage of missionaries and presumably because of the cooperation between the London and Rhenish Missionary Society at the time, they instead sent a German.

Reverend Heinrich Schmelen arrived in 1814 as missionary of the Kaiǀkhauan (Khauas Nama) and their leader Amraal Lambert. The Schmelenhaus was built the same year, long considered the oldest structure in Namibia. It is a National Monument since 1952 and serves currently as a small museum. It was later discovered that the church and the pastor's house in Warmbad, both destroyed in 1811, were older than the Schmelenhaus, and that the fortification of ǁKhauxaǃnas predates all European constructions. Schmelen also initiated the building of a chapel which was in ruins when James Edward Alexander visited the village in 1837.

In 1822, Schmelen left Bethanie after becoming dissatisfied with his missionary work among the local tribes, who refused his repeated and impassioned pleas to attend church and an ongoing conflict between Amraal Lambert's Orlam and another Namaqua tribe living at the station. Livestock and men were killed, and buildings burned. According to James Edward Alexander, Schmelen had "tried in vain to prevent the people of the station exchanging their cattle at [Lüderitz] ... for fire-arms and ammunition" and saw no end to the local conflicts.

The original church was built in 1859, and also still stands today.

In 1883, Bethanie was the scene of the historical land sale at the house of Namaqua chief Josef Frederiks II that would eventually establish Imperial Germany colony of German South West Africa. Adolf Lüderitz in May 1883 obtained the area of Angra Pequena (today the town of Lüderitz) from Frederiks for 100£ in gold and 200 rifles.

Politics
Bethanie is governed by a village council that has five seats. In the 2010 local authority election it was one of only a few local councils in Namibia that SWAPO did not win. The RDP narrowly beat SWAPO with 253 to 245 votes. The Democratic Turnhalle Alliance (DTA) finished in 3rd with 52 votes. The 2015 local authority election was won by SWAPO which gained three seats (278 votes) while the DTA gained the remaining two seats (188 votes).

In the 2020 local authority election the Landless People's Movement (LPM, a new party registered in 2018) won with 378 votes and gained three seats. One seat each went to the Popular Democratic Movement (PDM, the new name of the DTA since 2017) with 179 votes, and to SWAPO with 166 votes.

Media and popular culture 
A fictionalized version of Bethanie – named "Bethany" in English and depicted as a drought-plagued former mining town – is the primary setting for Richard Stanley's 1993 feature horror film, Dust Devil.

References

Footnotes

Literature

External links 

Village Council of Bethanie

Populated places in the ǁKaras Region
Villages in Namibia